Paul Gustave Simonon (born 15 December 1955) is an English musician and artist best known as the bassist for the Clash. More recent work includes his involvement in the supergroup the Good, the Bad & the Queen and playing on the Gorillaz album Plastic Beach in 2010, which saw Simonon reunite with The Clash guitarist Mick Jones and Blur frontman Damon Albarn – and which also led to Simonon becoming the live band's touring bassist for Gorillaz's Escape to Plastic Beach Tour. Simonon is also an established visual artist.

Early life
Simonon was born in Thornton Heath, Croydon, Surrey. His father, Gustave, was an amateur artist and his mother, Elaine, was a librarian. Simonon's paternal grandfather was a Belgian who moved to England during the First World War. He grew up in both the South London area of Brixton and Ladbroke Grove in West London, spending around a year in Siena and Rome, Italy with his mother and stepfather. Before joining the Clash, he had planned to become an artist. He studied at Byam Shaw School of Art (then based in Campden St, Kensington), which he attended on scholarship.

Career

He met Mick Jones in 1976, and six months later the Clash was formed when Joe Strummer joined, with Jones on lead guitar. Simonon learned his bass parts by rote from Jones in the early days of The Clash and still did not know how to play the bass when the group first recorded. He is credited with coming up with the name of the band and was mainly responsible for the visual aspects such as clothing and stage backdrops. Simonon was shown on the front cover of the band's double album London Calling: Pennie Smith's image of him smashing his Fender Precision Bass guitar during a 1979 concert in New York City; the image has become one of the iconic pictures of the punk era.

Simonon played bass on almost all of the Clash's songs. Recordings that he did not play on include: "The Magnificent Seven" and "Lightning Strikes (Not Once but Twice)" on Sandinista! (played by Norman Watt-Roy), "Rock the Casbah" on Combat Rock (played by Topper Headon), and Cut the Crap (played by Norman Watt-Roy). Sandinista! featured bass played by Jones or Strummer, some but possibly not all of which Simonon later re-recorded once he rejoined the sessions after filming Ladies and Gentlemen, The Fabulous Stains. Also, when performing "The Guns of Brixton" live he switched instruments with Joe Strummer, because it was easier for him to sing while playing guitar, instead of bass as he sings lead vocals on this track.

Simonon's contrapuntal reggae/ska-influenced lines set him apart from the bulk of other punk rock bassists of the era in their complexity and the role of the bass guitar within the band.

After the Clash dissolved in 1986, Simonon started a band called Havana 3am. He recorded one album with them. He also participated in a Bob Dylan session along with the Sex Pistols' Steve Jones that became part of the Dylan album Down in the Groove. Also, Simonon works as an artist – his first passion before joining the Clash. He has had several gallery shows, and designed the cover for Big Audio Dynamite's album, Tighten Up, Vol. 88, as well as the cover for "Herculean" from the album The Good, the Bad & the Queen, a project with Damon Albarn on which Simonon plays bass. Paul reunited with Damon Albarn and Mick Jones on the Gorillaz album Plastic Beach, and was also the bassist of the Gorillaz live band supporting Plastic Beach, along with Mick Jones on guitar. The band headlined the 2010 Coachella Festival, and took up residence at the Camden roundhouse for two nights in late April 2010.

In 2011, Simonon spent time aboard the Greenpeace vessel Esperanza incognito under the guise of "Paul the assistant cook" in response to Arctic oil drilling in Greenland by Cairn Oil. He joined other Greenpeace activists in illegally boarding one of Cairn's oil rigs; an action which earned him two weeks in a Greenland jail. His identity was revealed to other crew members after the voyage, and he joined Damon Albarn and the other members of the Good, the Bad & the Queen for a performance in London celebrating Greenpeace's 40th anniversary.

Actor Pete Morrow portrays Simonon in the 2016 film London Town. The film was met with mixed reviews.

Discography
With the Clash

 The Clash (1977)
 Give 'Em Enough Rope (1978)
 London Calling (1979)
 Sandinista! (1980)
 Combat Rock (1982)
 Cut the Crap (1985)

With Havana 3 am
 Havana 3 am (1991)

With The Good, the Bad & the Queen
 The Good, the Bad & the Queen (2007)
 Merrie Land (2018)

With Gorillaz
 Plastic Beach (2010) Simonon reunites with Clash guitarist Mick Jones on the album's title track.

With Galen & Paul (Galen Ayers & Paul Simonon)
 Can We Do Tomorrow Another Day? (2023)

Art

Selected solo exhibitions
 From Hammersmith to Greenwich (2002)
 Paul Simonon Recent Paintings (2008)
 Wot no Bike, ICA Nash and Brandon Rooms (2015). To accompany the exhibition, Simonon published a limited edition hardback publication also titled Wot no Bike. Featuring 24 of the paintings, it includes an introduction by David Lancaster, a writer on classic bikes and culture and an interview between Simonon and Tim Marlow, Director of Artistic Programmes at the Royal Academy of Arts, London.

Selected group exhibitions
 John Martin Gallery (1996)
 Eyes of a Child (1998)
 Crusaid Edinburgh Art Centre (1998)
 Art Tube Exhibition London Underground (2001)
 Notting Hill Arts Exhibition (2001)
 Colony Room Show (2001)

References

Further reading

External links

 The Clash website
 Interview with Bass Player magazine
 From Punk to Paint (BBC Interview)
 Paul Simonon's gallery at BBC
 Gallery at Art-Tube.com
 Interview with 3:AM Magazine
 Interview with Bassist Magazine

1955 births
Living people
English rock bass guitarists
English punk rock bass guitarists
20th-century English painters
English male painters
21st-century English painters
English republicans
People from Brixton
Alumni of the Byam Shaw School of Art
20th-century English bass guitarists
Male bass guitarists
The Clash members
English punk rock singers
English new wave musicians
British post-punk musicians
English male singers
Gorillaz members
English people of Belgian descent
Musicians from London
The Good, the Bad & the Queen members